This list of Numéro China cover models  is a catalog of cover models who have appeared on the cover of the Chinese edition of Numéro magazine, starting with the magazine's first issue in September 2010.

2010

2011

2012

2013

2014

2015

2016

2017

2018

2019

External links
 Numero China on Models.com

China